Stirchley may refer to:

Stirchley, Shropshire, one of the constituents of Telford
Stirchley, West Midlands, an area in south Birmingham